Ijevan Dendropark also known as Ijevan Subtropical Arboretum, is an arboretum located in Ijevan, Tavush Province, Armenia. Located on the right bank of Aghstev river, it was founded in 1962 by Mushegh Aghinyan, Griror Adamyants and Lyudvig Sayadyan.

The plant collection includes over 625 species and varieties.

References

Biota of Armenia
Tourist attractions in Tavush Province
Arboreta
Protected areas of Armenia
Botanical gardens in Armenia